The surname MacTavish or McTavish is a Scottish surname, it is one Anglicised form of the Gaelic MacThàmhais, i.e. son of Thomas.

People
Alastair MacTavish Dunnett (1908–1998), Scottish journalist
Anne Mactavish, Canadian Federal Court trial judge
Charles MacTavish (1818–1868), American landowner
Craig MacTavish (born 1958), Canadian professional ice hockey coach
Don MacTavish (1940–1969), American race driver
John MacTavish (British Consul), Scots-Canadian fur trade entrepreneur and British Consul to Baltimore, Maryland
Letitia MacTavish Hargrave (1813–1854), Scottish author of letters published as memoirs of 19th-century pioneer women in Canada
Scott Mactavish (contemporary), American filmmaker, author, and journalist
Shona Dunlop MacTavish (1920–2019), New Zealand dancer and dance teacher
William Mactavish (1815–1870), Scottish-born representative of the Hudson's Bay Company; governor of Rupert's Land and Assiniboia in Canada

Fictional people
Captain John "Soap" MacTavish, one of the main protagonists in Call of Duty 4: Modern Warfare, Call of Duty: Modern Warfare 2, and Call of Duty: Modern Warfare 3.

Other
Clan MacTavish, Scottish clan
SS Ina Mactavish
MacTavish Cup, shinty

See also
Tavish, a related given name

References

Mactavish
Mactavish
Mactavish